Sonneberg is a Kreis (district) in the south of Thuringia, Germany. Neighboring districts are (from the west clockwise) the districts Hildburghausen, Saalfeld-Rudolstadt, and the Bavarian districts Kronach and Coburg.

History
The district was created in 1868 when districts were introduced in Saxe-Meiningen. In 1952, parts of the district were split off into a newly created district Neuhaus am Rennweg. In 1994, Neuhaus am Rennweg was dissolved and the district Sonneberg regained its original size. In 2019 the municipalities Lichte and Piesau from the district Saalfeld-Rudolstadt came as villages into the town Neuhaus am Rennweg in the district Sonneberg.

Geography
The district is located on the southern slopes of the mountains of the Thuringian Forest. The land descends from the more than 800m tall hills (the highest elevation is the 869m high Großer Farmdenkopf) down to the lower plains Sonneberger Unterland and Schalkauer Platte. The Dreistromstein near Siegmundsburg near Neuhaus am Rennweg marks the intersection of three watersheds that drain into the rivers Rhine, Weser, and Elbe.

Coat of arms

Towns and municipalities

References

External links
Official website (German)

 
Districts of Thuringia